VLB may refer to:

Science and technology
 VESA Local Bus, a local bus based on the Intel 80486 CPU
 Very large board, a large printed circuit board
 Vincaleukoblastine, or vinblastine, an antitumor alkaloid

Other uses
 VLB Berlin (Versuch- u. Lehranstalt für Brauerei in Berlin), a brewing school and trade organization in Berlin
 Volunteer Life Brigade, the forerunners of today Auxiliary Coastguard in the United Kingdom